Thevenetimyia is a genus of bee flies in the family Bombyliidae. There are more than 40 described species in Thevenetimyia found worldwide, mostly in North America with several species in Australia and southeast Asia.

Species
These 43 species belong to the genus Thevenetimyia:

 Thevenetimyia accedens Hall, 1969
 Thevenetimyia affinis Hall, 1969
 Thevenetimyia auripila (Osten Sacken, 1887)
 Thevenetimyia australiensis (Hall, 1969)
 Thevenetimyia californica Bigot, 1875
 Thevenetimyia canuta Hall, 1969
 Thevenetimyia celer (Cole & Lovett, 1919)
 Thevenetimyia culiciformis (Hull, 1965)
 Thevenetimyia fascipennis (Williston, 1901)
 Thevenetimyia fergusoni Li & Rodrigues, 2018
 Thevenetimyia funesta (Osten Sacken, 1877)
 Thevenetimyia furvicostata (Roberts, 1929)
 Thevenetimyia halli (Hull, 1965)
 Thevenetimyia harrisi (Osten Sacken, 1877)
 Thevenetimyia hirta (Loew, 1876)
 Thevenetimyia intermedia (Hall, 1969)
 Thevenetimyia japonica Evenhuis & Ichige, 2017
 Thevenetimyia lanigera (Cresson, 1919)
 Thevenetimyia longipalpis (Hardy, 1921)
 Thevenetimyia lotus (Williston, 1893)
 Thevenetimyia luctifera (Osten Sacken, 1877)
 Thevenetimyia maculipennis (Hull, 1965)
 Thevenetimyia magna (Osten Sacken, 1877)
 Thevenetimyia major Li & Yeates, 2018
 Thevenetimyia marginata (Osten Sacken, 1877)
 Thevenetimyia melanderi (Hall, 1969)
 Thevenetimyia mimula (Hall, 1969)
 Thevenetimyia muricata (Osten Sacken, 1877)
 Thevenetimyia nigra (Macquart, 1834)
 Thevenetimyia nigrapicalis (Roberts, 1929)
 Thevenetimyia notata Hall, 1969
 Thevenetimyia nuri Rodrigues & Lamas, 2018
 Thevenetimyia painterorum (Hall, 1969)
 Thevenetimyia phalantha Hall, 1969
 Thevenetimyia quadrata (Williston, 1901)
 Thevenetimyia quedenfeldti (Engel, 1885)
 Thevenetimyia sodalis (Williston, 1893)
 Thevenetimyia speciosa Hall, 1969
 Thevenetimyia spinosavus
 Thevenetimyia tenta (Hall, 1969)
 Thevenetimyia tridentata (Hull, 1966)
 Thevenetimyia venosa (Bigot, 1892)
 Thevenetimyia zerrinae Hasbenli, 2005

References

External links

 
 
 

Bombyliidae genera